Krynica in certain Slavic languages means a well or spring. It may refer to the following places:
Krynica-Zdrój, a town in Lesser Poland Voivodeship (south Poland)
Krynica Morska, a coastal town in Pomeranian Voivodeship (north Poland)
Krynica, Chełm County in Lublin Voivodeship (east Poland)
Krynica, Białystok County in Podlaskie Voivodeship (northeast Poland)
Krynica, Hajnówka County in Podlaskie Voivodeship (northeast Poland)
Krynica, Mońki County in Podlaskie Voivodeship (northeast Poland)
Krynica, Masovian Voivodeship (east-central Poland)
Krynica, Sącz County, a city in Lesser Poland Voievodeship (south Poland)

See also